The following is a list of characters from the wuxia novel The Heaven Sword and Dragon Saber by Jin Yong. Some of these characters are fictionalised personas of, or are based on, actual historical figures, such as Zhu Yuanzhang, Chang Yuchun, Xu Da, Zhang Sanfeng and Chen Youliang.

Main characters 

 Zhang Wuji
 Zhao Min
 Zhou Zhiruo

Ming Cult 

 The Bright Left and Right Messengers serve as the cult leader's deputies.
 Yang Xiao is the Bright Left Messenger and Yang Buhui's father. During the period of internal conflict in the cult, he served as the cult's acting leader and attempted to master part of the "Heaven and Earth Great Shift" to secure his legitimacy as there were others who disapproved of his leadership. After Zhang Wuji becomes the cult leader, Yang Xiao serves as his adviser and becomes his close friend and confidant.
 Fan Yao is the Bright Right Messenger. He disfigured himself and disguised himself as a mute monk called Kutoutuo so that he could infiltrate Chaghan Temür's army and serve as a spy for the Ming Cult. His cover is blown when he helps the six major orthodox schools escape from Wan'an Monastery after they are captured and held captive there by Zhao Min.
 The Four Guardian Kings assist the leader in overseeing the cult's activities. They are ranked in order of seniority:
 Daiqisi, nicknamed "Purple Dress Dragon King", is one of the three Sacred Maidens of the Persian Ming Cult. She is of mixed heritage (Persian-Chinese) and was originally sent to China to search for the lost manual of the "Heaven and Earth Great Shift" and became Yang Dingtian's goddaughter. After defeating Han Qianye in the icy lake, she was promoted to the position of a guardian king in the Chinese Ming Cult. However, she had fallen in love with Han Qianye after the duel so she eventually eloped with him and settled with him on Divine Snake Island, where their daughter Xiaozhao was born. As she had broken her vow of celibacy, she faced execution if the Persian Ming Cult found her. Thus, she disguised herself as an old woman and called herself "Golden Flower Granny" to match Han Qianye's nickname, "Silver Leaf Gentleman".
 Yin Tianzheng, nicknamed "White Brows Eagle King", is Yin Yewang and Yin Susu's father, and Zhang Wuji's maternal grandfather. He left the Ming Cult during its internal conflict and founded the Heavenly Eagle Cult in his home region of Jiangnan. After Zhang Wuji becomes the Ming Cult's leader, the Heavenly Eagle Cult merged into the Ming Cult and Yin Tianzheng continued serving as a guardian king. Yin Tianzheng eventually dies of exhaustion while fighting the three Shaolin elders to save Xie Xun.
 Xie Xun, nicknamed "Golden Haired Lion King", is Zhang Wuji's godfather. His most powerful skill is the Lion's Roar, which allows him to project his inner energy through sound waves and cause internal injuries to everyone in the vicinity. His family was murdered by his former mentor Cheng Kun, who disappeared after committing the atrocity. Guided by fury, he went on a rampage to kill many people and push the blame to Cheng Kun, in the hope of forcing Cheng Kun to come out of hiding, but to no avail. After he kidnapped Zhang Cuishan and Yin Susu, Yin blinded him with her darts in self-defence when he was in a violent fit of insanity. His insanity was cured when he heard the cries of their newborn son, which reminded him of his own deceased son. He accepted their offer to be the godfather of their son, whom he named "Wuji" in memory of his son. The families and associates of Xie Xun's victims forgive him after his final confrontation with Cheng Kun. Xie Xun ultimately becomes a Buddhist monk for the rest of his life to seek peace and redemption for his past sins.
 Wei Yixiao, nicknamed "Green Winged Bat King", is unmatched in his qinggong prowess in the jianghu. He once accidentally infected himself with an icy venom while practising the skill Icy Palm. Since then, he has to routinely consume the warm blood of living creatures (including humans) to keep himself warm. Zhang Wuji cures him later by using the Nine Yang Divine Skill to purge the venom from his body.
 Yang Buhui is Yang Xiao and Ji Xiaofu's daughter. Her name literally means "no regrets" to reflect her mother's love for Yang Xiao. Zhang Wuji helps her escape from Miejue after her mother's death and leads her on a perilous journey to bring her safely to her father. She regards Zhang Wuji as a surrogate elder brother for his care and concern towards her. The trauma of witnessing her mother's death makes her become suspicious of anyone who could be a potential enemy and this intensifies her hatred towards Miejue. This is evident in her treatment towards Xiaozhao, when she and her father suspect Xiaozhao of being a spy from the Emei School. It also made her extremely protective towards her father and Zhang Wuji, whom she sees as what is left of her family. She falls in love with Yin Liting, her mother's original fiancé, and marries him despite the large age gap between them. They are expecting a child near the end of the novel.
 Zhu Yuanzhang is an ambitious minor leader of the cult who eventually unites the rebel forces under his control and leads them to overthrow the Yuan dynasty. He betrays the cult later and becomes the founding emperor of the Ming dynasty.
 Chang Yuchun is a cult member who travels with Zhang Wuji to Butterfly Valley to seek treatment from Hu Qingniu.
 Xu Da is a minor leader of the cult. Zhang Wuji presents him with Yue Fei's military text Book of Wumu. Xu Da, who is already a skilled military tactician, studies the book that refined his tactical skills and uses his knowledge to lead the rebels to victory in the battles against the Yuan forces and ultimately captures the Yuan capital Khanbaliq.
 Five Wanderers:
 Leng Qian, nicknamed "Cold Faced Gentleman".
 Shuobude, nicknamed "Monk with the Sack".
 Zhang Zhong, nicknamed "Iron Crowned Taoist".
 Peng Yingyu, nicknamed "Peng the Monk".
 Zhou Dian, nicknamed "Lunatic".
 Hu Qingniu is a physician residing in Butterfly Valley. He is nicknamed "Jiansi Bujiu" for his odd practice of treating the cult's members free of charge but not others regardless of whatever they are willing to pay. When Zhang Wuji visits him, he indirectly imparts his medical knowledge to the boy and helps him slow down the effects of his injury inflicted by the Xuanming Elders. Years ago, Daiqisi had brought Han Qianye to seek treatment from Hu Qingniu as they had been infected with an icy venom following their duel in the icy lake. However, Hu Qingniu had refused because Han Qianye was part of the Ming Cult; Han eventually died of poisoning. Daiqisi holds a grudge against Hu Qingniu and ultimately kills him to avenge Han Qianye.
 Wang Nangu is Hu Qingniu's wife. In contrast with her husband, she uses her mastery of toxicology to kill people. The couple become rivals in a contest, in which Wang will poison someone while Hu will try to save the person's life. Sharing her husband's liking of Zhang Wuji, she imparts her knowledge to Zhang by leaving behind a book on toxicology she wrote. She is killed along with her husband by Daiqisi.
 Yang Dingtian, who is only mentioned by name in the novel, was the former leader of the Ming Cult and one of the most powerful figures in the jianghu in his time. One day, while he was practising the Heaven and Earth Great Shift, he discovered his wife's secret affair with Cheng Kun. He was so infuriated and distracted that the inner energy flow in his body was disrupted, causing him to suffer grievous internal injuries and eventually die.
 Chiefs of the Five Elements factions:
 Zhuang Zheng is the chief of the Gold Banner Faction who is killed in battle by Miejue.
 Wu Jingcao is the former deputy chief of the Gold Banner Faction. Zhang Wuji promotes him to chief after Zhuang Zheng's death and tasks him with repairing the damaged Dragon-Slaying Saber.
 Yan Yuan is the chief of the Earth Banner Faction.
 Tang Yang is the chief of the Water Banner Faction.
 Wen Cangsong is the chief of the Wood Banner Faction.
 Xin Ran is the chief of the Fire Banner Faction.

Heavenly Eagle Cult 
 Yin Susu is Yin Tianzheng's daughter and Zhang Wuji's mother. She meets Zhang Cuishan by chance and both of them are kidnapped by Xie Xun and eventually all three of them end up on Ice Fire Island. She marries Zhang Cuishan and gives birth to Zhang Wuji. When the Zhang family returns to the mainland and are confronted by numerous wulin figures on the whereabouts of Xie Xun, the Zhang couple choose to commit suicide to protect Xie Xun.
 Yin Yewang is Yin Tianzheng's son and Yin Susu's elder brother. He is also Yin Li's father and Zhang Wuji's maternal uncle. His first wife (Yin Li's mother) practised the Thousand Spiders Venom Hand, became infertile and disfigured, and fell out of her husband's favour. Yin Yewang then took a concubine who bore him two sons. Yin Li killed her stepmother because she often bullied her mother, and then fled from home to evade her father's wrath.
 Yin Li is Yin Yewang's estranged daughter and Zhang Wuji's younger cousin. She practises the Thousand Spiders Venom Hand, a deadly skill which causes her face to become disfigured; she is thus known as Zhu'er. Her mother commits suicide to allow her to escape from her father and half-brothers after she killed her stepmother, and she has been despised by her father ever since. She encounters Daiqisi, who protects her and accepts her as an apprentice. Later, she develops feelings for Zhang Wuji when she first meets him in her childhood. She is apparently murdered by Zhou Zhiruo at one point, but is eventually revealed to have survived.
 Leaders of the halls and altars:
 Li Tianyuan is the leader of the Heaven Hall and Yin Tianzheng's junior.
 Chang Jinpeng is the leader of the Vermilion Bird Altar who is slain by Xie Xun.
 Bai Guishou is the leader of the Black Tortoise Altar who is slain by Ding Minjun.
 Cheng Chaofeng is the leader of the Azure Dragon Altar.
 Gao Shanwang is the leader of the White Tiger Altar
 Feng Gongying is the leader of the Divine Snake Altar.
 Yin Wufu, Yin Wulu, Yin Wushou are three bandits from the southwest who pledged allegiance to Yin Tianzheng after he saved their lives.

Persian Ming Cult 
 Xiaozhao is Han Qianye and Daiqisi's daughter. Her mother sends her as a spy to infiltrate the Ming Cult and find the location of its secret tunnel. Xiaozhao becomes a servant in Yang Xiao's household; the Yangs suspect her of being a spy so they bind her in chains to restrict her movements. Xiaozhao runs into Zhang Wuji and narrowly escapes death with him in the secret tunnel. She falls in love with Zhang Wuji but can never be with him because she has to take her mother's place as a virginal Sacred Maiden to save her mother's life. She eventually becomes the new leader of the Persian Ming Cult and returns to its headquarters in Persia. Jin Yong mentioned in the epilogue of the novel that Xiaozhao is his favourite character.
 The Wind, Cloud and Moon Three Messengers are in charge of safekeeping the Ming Cult's sacred artefacts – the Holy Flame Tablets – and are the most powerful fighters in the Persian Ming Cult:
 Mysterious Wind Messenger
 Drifting Cloud Messenger
 Bright Moon Messenger
 The 12 Guardian Kings of the Persian Ming Cult come to China to search for Daiqisi and bring her back to Persia. Four of them appear in the novel:
 Equality Guardian King
 Unity Guardian King
 Transparent Guardian King
 Victorious Guardian King

Yuan Empire 
 Chaghan Temür, the Prince of Ruyang, is the father of Wang Baobao and Zhao Min. The Yuan government tasked him with eliminating the Ming Cult and other anti-Yuan forces in the wulin.
 Lady Han is Chaghan Temür's concubine who is killed in Wan'an Monastery by Fan Yao.
 Köke Temür, also known by his Chinese name Wang Baobao, is Chaghan Temür's son and Zhao Min's brother.
 Lu Zhangke and He Biweng are the Xuanming Elders who serve under Chaghan Temür. They specialise in the skill Xuanming Divine Palm, which they once used it on Zhang Wuji. Later, after seeing how powerful Zhou Zhiruo has become from mastering the Nine Yin Manual, they attempt to seize the book from her but are unwilling to share it with each other so they start fighting over the manual. Zhang Wuji and Zhao Min show up to help Zhou Zhiruo and defeat the Xuanming Elders.
 Huogong Toutuo's apprentices are recruited by Chaghan Temür as mercenaries. They are responsible for massacring members of the Dragon Gate Security Service, paralysing Yu Daiyan, and injuring Yin Liting. Zhang Wuji defeats them one by one when Zhao Min calls on them to fight him.
 Fang Dongbai, also called Ada, is nicknamed "Eight Arms Divine Swordsman" because his skill in swordplay appears to be unmatched. He was originally a high-ranking member of the Beggars' Gang, but later faked his death and became a servant of Chaghan Temür.
 Aer
 Asan paralysed Yu Daiyan and Yin Liting.
 Gangxiang is killed by Zhang Sanfeng when he tried to ambush him while in disguise as a Shaolin monk called Kongxiang.
 The "Divine Arrow Eight Heroes" are a group of eight martial artists serving under Chaghan Temür.
 Zhao Yishang
 Qian Erbai
 Sun Sanhui
 Li Sicui
 Zhou Wushu
 Wu Liupo
 Zheng Qimie
 Wang Bashuai

Wudang School 

 Zhang Sanfeng is the founder and leader of the Wudang School. Previously from the Shaolin School, he was known as Zhang Junbao and had learnt part of the Nine Yang Manual and Yang Guo's skills. He was expelled from Shaolin after the monks mistakenly believed that he had secretly learnt Shaolin martial arts without formal approval. Several years later, he founded the Wudang School, which has become one of the six major orthodox martial arts schools in the wulin. In his old age, he is highly respected not only for his prowess in martial arts, but also for his morally upright character.
 The "Seven Heroes of Wudang" are Zhang Sanfeng's first seven apprentices. Their master named them after seven beautiful sights he had seen in his life, and they collectively form a landscape painting: yuanqiao ("distant bridge"); lianzhou ("lotus boat"); daiyan ("rock of Mount Tai"); songxi ("pine stream"); cuishan ("green mountains"); liting ("pear-shaped pavilion"); and shenggu ("echoic valley"). The seven, listed in order of seniority, are as follows:
 Song Yuanqiao is a reputable swordsman and the most likely candidate to succeed his master as Wudang's leader. However, he is disgraced by his son's misconduct and loses the opportunity to be Wudang's leader. Zhang Sanfeng orders him to spend the rest of his life in solitude.
 Yu Lianzhou is the most powerful in martial arts among the seven who eventually succeeds his master as the leader of Wudang.
 Yu Daiyan was ambushed and paralysed by Asan and lost the use of his limbs. He receives medical treatment from Zhang Wuji 20 years after his injury but only manages to recover partially and can no longer utilise the full potential of his martial arts. He spends the rest of his life imparting his knowledge of Wudang martial arts to the later generations.
 Zhang Songxi is the most intelligent among the seven who occasionally provides advice to his fellows.
 Zhang Cuishan is Zhang Wuji's father and the most talented among the seven. Apart from being an accomplished swordsman, he is also well versed in scholarly arts and calligraphy. His distinctive weapons earn him the nickname "Silver Hook Iron Brush". He meets Yin Susu by chance and they are both kidnapped by Xie Xun; all three of them end up on Ice Fire Island, where they settle down for ten years. Zhang marries Yin and they have a son, Zhang Wuji; Zhang also becomes sworn brothers with Xie Xun, who becomes his son's godfather. After the Zhang family return to the mainland, they are cornered by numerous wulin figures demanding to know the whereabouts of Xie Xun. Zhang Cuishan and Yin Susu refuse to reveal Xie Xun's location and eventually choose to take their own lives.
 Yin Liting was Ji Xiaofu's original fiancé. Their engagement ended when she realised that she loved Yang Xiao and was already pregnant with Yang's child. Many years later, after Yin Liting is injured in the same way as Yu Daiyan, her daughter Yang Buhui nurses him back to health and falls in love with him when he is recovering. Yin marries Yang Buhui eventually despite the large age gap between them and they are expecting a child towards the end of the novel.
 Mo Shenggu is the youngest of the seven and the most hot-tempered one. He tries to discipline Song Qingshu after discovering the latter's voyeuristic attempts on Zhou Zhiruo and the Emei School's members. However, he is ambushed by Chen Youliang and accidentally killed by Song Qingshu.
 Song Qingshu, nicknamed "Jade-Faced Mengchang", is Song Yuanqiao's arrogant, spoiled son. His strong crush on Zhou Zhiruo makes him become extremely jealous when he sees Zhang Wuji and Zhou developing a romantic relationship. That ultimately becomes his weakness because it allows him to be manipulated easily by Chen Youliang and Cheng Kun into doing anything to win Zhou Zhiruo's heart and prove that he is better than Zhang Wuji. After killing Mo Shenggu, he betrays the Wudang School and reluctantly joins the Beggars' Gang and helps Chen Youliang. Later, after Zhang Wuji reneges on his promise to marry Zhao Min instead as that is his true love, Zhou Zhiruo pretends to agree to marry Song Qingshu and teaches him the Nine Yin White Bone Claw while plotting to use him to take her revenge on Zhang Wuji. In the end, Song Qingshu is defeated by Yu Lianzhou and taken back to the Wudang School, where he is executed by Zhang Sanfeng for his crimes.

Emei School

 Guo Xiang was the founder of the Emei School and the younger daughter of Guo Jing and Huang Rong. In the prologue, she met Jueyuan and Zhang Junbao near Shaolin Monastery. Jueyuan recited the Nine Yang Manual to her, Zhang, and Wuse before his death. Guo Xiang's prowess in martial arts improved after she integrated the manual's skills into her existing ones. She inherited the Heaven-Reliant Sword and the knowledge of the secrets in the weapons from her family during the Battle of Xiangyang. After her family members sacrificed their lives to defend Xiangyang from Mongol invaders, she continued to roam the jianghu for years before settling down on Mount Emei, where she founded the Emei School. (See Template:Guo Jing and Huang Rong's family tree for her family tree.)
 Abbess Miejue, whose name "Miejue" literally means "destroy and eliminate", is the radically dogmatic leader of the Emei School. She aims to purge the wulin of evil and make Emei the leading orthodox school. Her dogmatic and extreme views lead her to commit various ethically and morally vicious deeds, including the indiscriminate slaughter of everyone associated with the Ming Cult and unorthodox martial arts schools. She hates the Ming Cult not only because of its "evil" name, but also because of Yang Xiao's indirect involvement in the events leading to Guhongzi's death. At Wan'an Monastery, she names Zhou Zhiruo her successor and plunges to her death from the tower after refusing Zhang Wuji's help.
 Guhongzi was Miejue's senior who challenged Yang Xiao to a duel. He borrowed Miejue's Heaven-Reliant Sword in the hope that it would give him an advantage. However, he lost to Yang Xiao and the sword was seized from him by Yang before he could even unsheathe it. Yang Xiao made some unkind remarks, threw the sword to the ground and walked away. Guhongzi felt disgraced and insulted and eventually died in frustration. His death caused Miejue to bear a grudge against Yang Xiao and the Ming Cult.
 Ji Xiaofu is one of Miejue's apprentices who is seen as a potential successor to her master. She is originally Yin Liting's fiancée but falls in love with Yang Xiao instead and bears him a daughter. She secretly leaves Emei to raise her child, whom she names "Buhui" (literally "no regrets") to reflect her love for Yang Xiao. At one point, she meets Zhang Wuji, who has just lost his parents, and takes care of him; Zhang Wuji sees her as a motherly-like figure. Miejue eventually tracks her down and forces her to kill Yang Xiao, but she refuses and is killed by her master in grief.
 Ding Minjun is one of Miejue's most senior apprentices. She is jealous that their master favours Ji Xiaofu and later Zhou Zhiruo. Peng Yingyu once remarked that she is "ugly in appearance and evil-hearted" after she blinded his right eye. She once appoints herself as Emei's acting leader when Zhou Zhiruo goes missing, but her peers are reluctant to follow her because of her selfishness.
 Bei Jinyi is one of Miejue's apprentices and a junior of Ding Minjun and Ji Xiaofu. When her master orders her to pursue and kill Yang Buhui, she decides to spare the girl on account of her past relations with Ji Xiaofu, so she lies to Miejue that the girl has already escaped.
 Zhao Lingzhu
 Li Mingxia
 Su Mengqing
 Fang Bilin
 Jingxuan is accidentally injured by Zhang Wuji when she was making her way to Bright Peak. She collects the remains of the broken Heaven-Reliant Sword at the end of the story.
 Jinghui is an impulsive nun who explains to Zhang Wuji the truth about Zhou Zhiruo's relationship with Song Qingshu.
 Jingxu is killed by Wei Yixiao during her journey to Bright Peak.
 Jingzhao attempts to assassinate Xie Xun at the Lion Slaying Ceremony.
 Jingjia kills Situ Qianzhong and Xia Zhou at the Lion Slaying Ceremony with the Thunderbolt Fire Bombs.
 Jingkong
 Jingxian
 Jingzhen
 Jingdao
 Jingfeng
 Jingxin
 Jinghe

Shaolin School 

 Jueyuan was Wuse and Wuxiang's junior who is credited as Zhang Junbao's master. Before his death, he recited the Nine Yang Manual to Zhang Junbao and Guo Xiang, who respectively founded the Wudang and Emei schools later.
 Cheng Kun, nicknamed "Primordial Chaos Thunderbolt Hand", is a scheming villain who had a secret affair with Yang Dingtian's wife. Yang, who was practising the Heaven and Earth Great Shift when he discovered the affair, died in anger when the inner energy flow in his body was disrupted due to the distraction. Yang's wife felt guilty so she committed suicide to join her husband. Cheng Kun has since held a grudge against the Ming Cult and seeks to destroy it. He managed to hide his past and joined the Shaolin School as a monk named Yuanzhen. During this time, he stirred up conflict between the Ming Cult and the six major orthodox schools through a series of machinations. He also pretended to accept Xie Xun as an apprentice and later murdered Xie's family in cold blood. Although he dislikes the Mongols, he still reluctantly becomes an adviser to Chaghan Temür and helps him devise plans to eliminate the Ming Cult. As the story progresses, he becomes corrupted by his lust for power and plots with Chen Youliang to dominate the wulin, but their plan is foiled by Zhang Wuji and others. He is eventually defeated and blinded by Xie Xun and becomes a handicap for the rest of his life.
 The "Four Holy Monks" are four senior monks in the Shaolin School:
 Kongjian, who mastered the art of invincibility, attempted to appease Xie Xun by allowing the latter to kill him without defending himself. Xie Xun later often regretted killing Kongjian.
 Kongwen is the abbot of Shaolin.
 Kongzhi is Kongwen's hot-tempered junior.
 Kongxing is murdered by Asan.
 The Three Elders of the Bodhidharma Hall form the Vajra Evil Subduing Ring to guard Xie Xun when he is held captive in Shaolin. More than 30 years ago, they fought with Yang Dingtian after being instigated by Cheng Kun and were injured by him. Since then, they have retreated into a state of "withering meditation". They become more aware of Cheng Kun's wicked intentions after listening to Zhang Wuji's explanations. The Three Elders are:
 Du'e lost his left eye during a fight with Yang Dingtian.
 Dujie
 Dunan
 Huogong Toutuo was a Shaolin traitor who fled to the Western Regions, where he founded the Vajra School.

Kunlun School 

 He Zudao, nicknamed "Kunlun Three Sage", was a senior member of the Kunlun School who mastered three arts – swordplay, qi and qin – hence his nickname. He fell in love with Guo Xiang at first sight and helped her fend off some attackers. He had met Yinkexi, who stole the Nine Yang Manual from the Shaolin School, and misheard that the "manual is in the oil" when Yinkexi actually meant "the manual is in the ape". After Zhang Junbao defeated him, he swore never to return to central China and had remained in the western regions until his death. His name is a word play on an archaic Chinese phrase, hezudao ("no need to mention"). 
 He Taichong, nicknamed "Iron Qin Gentleman", is the ungrateful and immoral leader of the Kunlun School. He and his wife try to kill Zhang Wuji and Yang Buhui after Zhang saves his concubine from death, but Yang Xiao saves the two children. Later, he attempts to kill Xie Xun, who is held captive in Shaolin Monastery, so that he can take the Dragon-Slaying Saber, but ends up being killed by the three Shaolin elders.
 Ban Shuxian is He Taichong's wife and an expert in the Dual Swordplay. She is killed along with her husband by the three Shaolin elders while attempting to kill Xie Xun.

Mount Hua School 

 Xianyu Tong, nicknamed "Shenjizi", is the promiscuous and immoral leader of the Mount Hua School. Hu Qingniu once saved his life when he was infected with Golden Worm Poison by Lady Miao, whom he previously had a relationship with. Hu Qingniu's sister, Hu Qingyang, fell in love with him while he was recovering and married him. However, he forced Hu Qingyang to kill herself so that he could marry the daughter of his predecessor, even though Hu Qingyang was already pregnant with his child. Xianyu Tong's wicked deed was discovered by his senior, Bai Yuan, whom he murdered. He then framed the Ming Cult for the murder. During the battle at Bright Peak, Xianyu Tong attempts to kill Zhang Wuji, but ends up being defeated and having his dirty secrets exposed. He dies at the hands of He Taichong incidentally during the fight.
 Xue Gongyuan is one of Xianyu Tong's apprentices. After he and several others were injured by Daiqisi, they went to Butterfly Valley to seek treatment from Hu Qingniu. Zhang Wuji heals them but they repay his kindness with evil by attempting to kill him and Yang Buhui. Zhang Wuji kills them by tricking them into consuming a poisonous broth.

Kongtong School 

 The Five Elders of Kongtong bore a grudge against Xie Xun after he stole the Seven Injuries Fist manual from them. Four of them have their names mentioned in the novel: Guan Neng, Zong Weixia, Tang Wenliang and Chang Jingzhi. After they are defeated during the battle at Bright Peak, Zhang Wuji heals them and saves them from permanent paralysis. They feel so grateful to him that they renounce their past feuds with the Ming Cult.
 Jian Jie is a minor member of the Kongtong School who was injured by Daiqisi. He is healed by Zhang Wuji but repays Zhang's kindness with evil by making cannibalistic attempts on Zhang and Yang Buhui. Zhang Wuji kills him by tricking him into consuming a poisonous broth.

Beggars' Gang 

 Chen Youliang is Cheng Kun's apprentice. He serves the Beggars' Gang as a spy for his master and manipulates Song Qingshu into betraying the Wudang School. He defects to the Ming Cult after Cheng Kun's defeat but betrays the cult later and becomes a territorial warlord after the fall of the Yuan Empire.
 Shi Huolong is the mysterious chief of the Beggars' Gang who is hardly known to the wulin except by name because he rarely makes public appearances. He was murdered by Cheng Kun and Chen Youliang, who replaced him with an imposter under their control. Zhang Wuji defeats and exposes the imposter later.
 Shi Hongshi is Shi Huolong's daughter. She was rescued by the Yellow Dress Maiden after her father was murdered, and eventually succeeds her father as the chief of the Beggars' Gang.

Zhu and Wu families 
 Zhu Changling, nicknamed "Heavenly Shaking Brush", is a descendant of Zhu Ziliu who is skilled in using the Yiyang Finger. He collaborates with Wu Lie to trick Zhang Wuji into revealing the location of Xie Xun.
 Wu Lie is a descendant of Wu Santong who plots with Zhu Changling to deceive Zhang Wuji into revealing Xie Xun's whereabouts.
 Zhu Jiuzhen is Zhu Changling's daughter. Though beautiful in appearance, she is cruel and sadistic. She seduces Zhang Wuji and helps her father and Wu Lie trick Zhang into revealing Xie Xun's whereabouts. She is killed by Yin Li.
 Wu Qingying is Wu Lie's daughter. She is Wei Bi's romantic interest and Zhu Jiuzhen's love rival.
 Wei Bi is Wu Lie's apprentice who wants to win the love of both Zhu Jiuzhen and Wu Qingying. He is slain by Wei Yixiao while attempting to sneak up on him.

Others
 Han Qianye was nicknamed "Silver Leaf Gentleman". He sought revenge on Yang Dingtian and challenged him to a fight. Daiqisi took up his challenge and they fought in the Icy Lake. They fell in love and later left for good to settle on a remote island, where their daughter Xiaozhao was born. In an earlier edition of the novel, Fan Yao was suspected of poisoning Han to death.
 The Yellow Dress Maiden, whose name is not revealed in the novel, is a descendant of Yang Guo and Xiaolongnü. She appears to help Zhang Wuji in times of danger. She defeats Zhou Zhiruo's Nine Yin White Bone Claw with an orthodox version of the skills in the Nine Yin Manual. (See Template:Yang Kang and Mu Nianci's family tree for her family tree.)
 Situ Qianzhong is a drunk martial artist who befriends Zhou Dian at the Lion Slaying Ceremony. He is killed by Jingjia.
 Xia Zhou is a brother of one of Xie Xun's victims. He is killed by Jingjia along with Situ Qianzhong at the Lion Slaying Ceremony.
 Du Baidang and Yi Sanniang are the parents of one of Xie Xun's victims. The couple provided shelter for Zhang Wuji and Zhao Min when they are heading to Shaolin. The couple are murdered by Zhou Zhiruo later.

References

Condor Trilogy
The Heaven Sword and Dragon Saber
Lists of Jin Yong characters